Saint Crispin may refer to:

Crispin and Crispinian (3rd century), martyrs (memorial: 25 October)
Crispin of Pavia (5th century), bishop (7 January)
Crispin of Viterbo (1668-1750), Capuchin (19 May)